RCA/Jive Label Group (sometimes stylized as RCA/JIVE Label Group) was a short-lived American record label group, owned by Sony Music Entertainment and representing the merger of the RCA Music Group and JIVE Label Group. The umbrella group was formed in 2007 under the name BMG Label Group, was rebranded as RCA/Jive Label Group in 2009. In July 2011 it was finally dissolved into two separate labels: the RCA Music Group and Epic Records which took Jive subsidiaries (LaFace, Battery, etc.) until October 2011 when it retired Jive Records along with Arista Records and J Records. The artists on those three labels were moved to  RCA Records.

History

Formation as BMG
RCA/Jive configuration began as the BMG Label Group during the last year of the Sony BMG merger. The group was officially formed in September 2007 when Bertelsmann Music Group restructured their RCA and Zomba groups into one entity bearing the BMG branding.  Bob Anderson and Kevin Twitchell led the sales department for the new group, and John Fleckenstein was named senior VP of international. By early 2008, the BMG Label Group was said to consist of RCA Records, Jive Records, J Records, LaFace, Arista, Volcano Entertainment, Verity, GospoCentric and Fo Yo Soul.  In April 2008, Jive head Barry Weiss was promoted to chairman and CEO of the whole BMG Label Group, a position he still held since the groups rebranding. Weiss replaced longtime music exec Clive Davis, who became the Chief Creative Officer. Though some interpreted this move by Sony as a way of shuffling Davis out of the company, he quickly reasserted his position as a hitmaker for Sony working with artists such as  Leona Lewis and Jennifer Hudson.

Rebranding to RCA/Jive Label Group
In August 2008, BMG sold their half of the Sony BMG merger back to Sony.  Since Bertelsmann retained the use of the "BMG" name, Sony renamed the BMG Label Group to RCA/Jive Label Group in early 2009, while at the same time, the Zomba Label Group officially began the process of rebranding to Jive Label Group.  During 2009, branding for both Zomba Label Group and Jive Label Group linked to the same website while RCA/Jive seemed to eschew the Zomba name, suggesting that the branding was in process during this time. By early 2010, the Zomba site was completely reworked as the rebranding process was completed.  Following the restructuring, Barry Weiss remained head of both RCA/Jive Label Group, and its constituent Jive Label Group. Weiss left the RCA/Jive Label Group in March 2011.

Dissolution

In mid-2011, Sony Music split RCA/Jive Label Group. Staff and artists associated with Jive were moved to a restructured Epic Records which is aimed to focus on (mostly) urban music. RCA Music Group remained on its own, and even took on some of the non-urban artist from Jive, such as notable pop superstar Britney Spears.  L.A. Reid became Chairman and CEO of Epic Records and Peter Edge became Chairman and CEO of RCA Music Group.

Structure
Though the RCA/Jive Label Group was often mentioned in press releases, and the entity often appeared as a copyright and phonograph rights holder on actual releases (this changed recently as of 2010, with each individual label being credited as itself on phonograph rights), it had a less public presence and no known website. Instead, both the RCA Music Group and the Jive Label Group operate as standalone units, but shared back-office functions and reported to CEO Barry Weiss. RCA/Jive consisted of several flagship record labels, which originally formed part of BMG before being absorbed into Sony's operations.

RCA Music Group

RCA Music Group was created by BMG in March 2004 shortly after the formation of Zomba Label Group.  It became a part of the BMG Label Group along with Zomba, and remained unscathed after the rebranding. The group continued its operations following the dissolution of its parent group in 2011.
During the existence of the RCA/Jive Label Group, the RCA Music Group consisted of the following labels:
Arista Records
J Records
Phonogenic Records
RCA Records
The Inc Records

Jive Label Group

Jive Label Group is a music group which formed half of the RCA/Jive Label Group, a division of Sony Music Entertainment. Jive Label Group was founded in 2004 as Zomba Label Group by BMG, their parent company at the time. In January 2009. BMG sold their half of the Sony BMG merger to Sony and Zomba Label Group was rebranded to the current Jive Label Group.

During the existence of the RCA/Jive Label Group, the Jive Label Group consisted of the following labels:
Battery Records
Jive Records
LaFace Records
So So Def Recordings
Verity Gospel Music Group
GospoCentric Records
Verity Records
Fo Yo Soul
Quiet Water Entertainment
Volcano Entertainment

History
In late 2002, Zomba completed a US$2.74 billion transaction that required BMG to purchase the remaining shares of the Zomba Group of Companies. When BMG began their integration of Zomba labels into their operations, they created the Zomba Label Group in early 2004. Initially the group consisted of LaFace, Volcano, Silvertone and Jive, though later expanded to include other labels. In 2005, Zomba Label Group created a gospel division called Zomba Gospel to collate their gospel interests at the time. The group primarily consisted of GospoCentric Records and Verity Records, but also included some artist-owned imprints. After being shuffled under Sony in late 2008, the Zomba Label Group began rebranding to the Jive Label Group. Additionally, Zomba Gospel was rebranded as the Verity Gospel Music Group.
In mid-2011, Jive Label Group was separated from the RCA Music Group and joined Epic Records under the newly formed Epic Label Group. Because of the stylistic focus of the new group (largely urban music), some of Jive's non-urban artists, such as Britney Spears, stayed with RCA Records.

Artists
List of RCA Records artists

Discography
The record labels under RCA/Jive have been releasing material since before the entity's existence. For detailed discographies of those labels, please visit their respective pages. For a list of releases which contain RCA/Jive as the copyright holder, see: RCA/Jive Label Group discography.

Personnel

See also
List of record labels
Epic Records
RCA Music Group
Sony Music Entertainment
Sony BMG
Bertelsmann Music Group

References

American record labels
Record labels established in 2007
Sony Music